Chal Mohan Ranga is a 2018 Indian Telugu-language romantic comedy film directed by Krishna Chaitanya and produced by Sudhakar Reddy along with Pawan Kalyan and Trivikram Srinivas. The film stars Nithiin and Megha Akash while Madhunandan, Rao Ramesh, Naresh and Lissy in play supporting roles. The film has story by Trivikram Srinivas and the cinematography is by Natarajan Subramaniam. The film's score and soundtrack are scored by S. S. Thaman. The theatrical trailer was released on March 13, 2018. The film was released on 5 April 2018 to decent reviews praising the performances, music, comedy and criticized the story-less and flat narration. Finally the film commercially failed at the box-office. Lissy made her comeback with this film in supporting roles, after a 27-year hiatus.

Plot

The film opens with the arrival of an ambulance to a respective hospital. As the ambulance door opens and takes the victims of an accident case to ICU for treatment, Mohan Ranga (Nithiin) narrates his story.

Cast

 Nithiin as Mohan Ranga
 Megha Akash as Megha Subramanyam
 Madhunandan as Vilas 
 Rao Ramesh as Ramesh
 Naresh as Mohan's father
 Pragathi as Mohan's mother
 Lissy as Megha's mother
 Sanjay Swaroop as Megha's father
 Baby Hasini as Megha's sister
 Neeraja Kona as Miami
 Kireeti Damaraju as Ramesh's son
 Ashu Reddy as Ashu
 Rohini Hattangadi
 Satya as Mohan's friend
Pammi Sai as Mohan's friend

Soundtrack

The film's soundtrack consists of six songs composed by S. S. Thaman.

Critical reception

Neeshita Nyayapati of The Times of India gave the film a rating of 2.5 out of 5 saying that, "‘Chal Mohan Ranga’ is an aimless and time-pass ride, which starts out with promise and has a few highs – if only it had a better story and character development." Priyanka Sundar of Hindustan Times gave the film a rating of 2 out of 5 saying that the film "suffers throughout because of cliches and would have been unbearable if not for the comedy woven throughout." Hemanth Kumar of Firstpost gave the film a rating of 2 out of 5 saying that, "This was a soul-sucking experience and it's hard to recall any other ‘romantic drama’ in recent times which crushed the whole point of what makes a romantic film ‘romantic’ to pulp and that too in such a glorious manner." Suresh Kavirayani of Deccan Chronicle gave the film a rating of 2.5 out of 5 saying that, "First half is narrated in an entertaining way and the second half is saved by the climax. It's just a time pass film."

Notes

References

External links

2018 films
2010s Telugu-language films
Films shot in Andhra Pradesh
Films shot in New Jersey
Films set in Andhra Pradesh
2018 romantic comedy films
Films scored by Thaman S
Indian romantic comedy films